Eslamiyeh (also Romanized as Eslāmīyeh; also known as Shahrak-e Eslāmīyeh) is a village in Pishkuh Rural District of the Central District of Taft County, Yazd province, Iran. At the 2006 National Census, its population was 1,532 in 451 households. The following census in 2011 counted 1,456 people in 460 households. The latest census in 2016 showed a population of 1,655 people in 550 households; it was the largest village in its rural district.

References 

Taft County

Populated places in Yazd Province

Populated places in Taft County